The Annie Award for Storyboard in an Animated Feature Production is an Annie Award awarded annually to the best storyboard artist and introduced in 1995. It rewards animation of characters for animated feature films.

Up until the creation of the Annie Award for Storyboarding in a TV Production, TV series, animated shorts, and non-theatrical releases were eligible for nomination in this category.

Winners and nominees 
*= non-feature nominee^=non-theatrical nominee†=live-action nominee

1990s

2000s

2010s

2020s

References

External links 
 Annie Awards: Legacy

Annie Awards